Ivanov is a Bulgarian and Russian surname.

Ivanov may also refer to:

Sukhoi Su-2, a Soviet airplane codenamed "Ivanov"
Ivanov (band), French band
Ivanov (play), by Anton Chekhov
Ivanov (film), a 2010 Russian film

See also
 
 Ivanovo (disambiguation)